The Ambassador Extraordinary and Plenipotentiary of the Russian Federation to Afghanistan is the official representative of the President and the Government of the Russian Federation to Afghanistan.

The ambassador and his staff work at large in the Embassy of Russia in Kabul. The post of Russian Ambassador to Afghanistan is currently held by Dmitry Zhirnov, incumbent since 29 April 2020.

History of diplomatic relations

The Russian Soviet Federative Socialist Republic provided unofficial assistance to the Emirate of Afghanistan during the Third Anglo-Afghan War, helping the country to achieve full independence from British influence. The Russian Soviet Federative Socialist Republic was also the first country to recognize and established diplomatic relations with Afghanistan in 1919. , a former diplomatic representative to Denmark, was appointed plenipotentiary to Afghanistan. On 23 July 1923 relations established at the level of embassies.

From 1992 to 2002, during the years of Taliban rule, diplomatic relations were broken off and no ambassadors were appointed.

List of representatives (1919 – present)

Representatives of the Russian Soviet Federative Socialist Republic to the Emirate of Afghanistan (1919 – 1922)

Representatives of the Soviet Union to the Emirate of Afghanistan (1922 – 1926)

Representatives of the Soviet Union to the Kingdom of Afghanistan (1926 – 1973)

Representatives of the Soviet Union to the Republic of Afghanistan (1973 – 1978)

Representatives of the Soviet Union to the Democratic Republic of Afghanistan (1978 – 1991)

Representatives of the Russian Federation to the Democratic Republic of Afghanistan (1991 – 1992)

Representatives of the Russian Federation to the Islamic Republic of Afghanistan (2002 – present)

References

External links 
  Embassy of Russia to Afghanistan
  Полномочное представительство - Посольство СССР в Афганистане

 
Afghanistan
Russia
Ambassadors of the Soviet Union to Afghanistan